Save the Rhino International (SRI), a UK-based conservation charity, is Europe's largest single-species rhino charity, in terms of funds raised, grants made, and profile and positioning. It began fundraising for in situ rhino conservation projects in 1992 and was formally registered as a charity (number 1035072) in 1994. One of SRI's founder patrons was the British writer and humorist Douglas Adams, who also was known to be a conservation movement enthusiast.

Mission, aims and objectives

Save the Rhino International works to conserve viable populations of Critically endangered rhinos in Africa and Asia. They recognise that the future of wildlife is inextricably linked to the communities that share its habitat. By funding field projects and through education, the goal of Save the Rhino is to deliver material, long-lasting and widespread benefits to rhinos and other endangered species, ecosystems, and the people living in these areas.

The aims of Save the Rhino are:
 To increase the number of rhinos in genetically viable populations in the wild
 To enhance the integrity of ecosystems
 To ensure that local communities benefit from conservation activities

NB:
Genetically viable populations are generally taken to mean those with a minimum of 20 individuals. In some areas, smaller populations have been known to breed successfully, although it is not known what the impact is on the long-term genetic diversity of such a population.

For rhino populations to qualify as being "wild", three conditions must be satisfied:
They must be free-ranging within an area large enough to sustain a breeding group
The area in question must consist of natural rhino habitat
They must survive by feeding off natural vegetation in the area (i.e., without human intervention)

Primary objectives of Save the Rhino:
 To provide financial support for on site projects focused on all five of the rhinoceros species
 To encourage and enable the sharing of information, experience and skills between rhino programmes, ex situ and conservation organisations
 To measure and improve the effectiveness of Save the Rhino's grant-making and charitable activities
 To raise awareness of the need for rhino conservation and communicate the work of Save the Rhino

Grant-making activities

The funds SRI raises are used to support projects that address rhino conservation through a number of measures:
Community conservation programmes that develop sustainable methods by which local communities can creatively manage natural resources
Environmental education programmes that teach children and adults about the importance of preserving natural resources and address human-wildlife conflict issues
Anti-poaching and monitoring patrols, which detect and deter poachers and gather information about rhino ranges and numbers
Translocations, so that rhino from established populations can be reintroduced to former habitats
Research into the threats to rhino survival and alternatives to the use of rhino horn
Veterinary work, such as the implanting of transmitters into horns, or removal of snares

Approach

Save the Rhino:
 Employs pragmatic approach focused on viable populations, and is not sentiment-driven
 Supports the sustainable use of natural resources for the mutual benefit of wildlife, habitat and local communities
 Supports the sustainable use of wildlife (i.e. culling, cropping and hunting) provided it is legal and the profits are ploughed back into conservation
 Does not create or run their own projects in the field; instead, SRI works with rhino conservation projects that already exist and provides funding
 Prefers to work with projects on a long-term basis, rather than making one-off or ad hoc grants
 Believes in the value of partnership working with other in situ and ex situ non-governmental organizations (NGOs) and conservation organisations

Trustees and patrons

Trustees

 Henry Chaplin
 Christina Franco
 Tim Holmes
 Tom Kenyon-Slaney (chair)
 George Stephenson (vice-chair)
 Dave Stirling

Patrons

 Polly Adams
 Benedict Allen
 Clive Anderson
 Louise Aspinall
 Nick Baker
 Simon Barnes
 Mark Carwardine
 Chloe Chick
 Mark Coreth
 Dina de Angelo
 Robert Devereux
 Ben Hoskyns-Abrahall
 Angus Innes
destiny gilliam

 Francesco Nardelli
 Martina Navratilova
 Julian Ozanne
 Viscount Petersham
 Mark Sainsbury
 Robin Saunders
 Alec Seccombe
 Tira Shubart
 James Sunley
 Nick Tims
 William Todd-Jones
 Jack Whitehall

Founding patrons

Douglas Adams

Douglas Adams developed his deep-seated interest in wildlife conservation during a 1985 visit to Madagascar, which eventually resulted in a book (Last Chance to See) about the plight of species facing extinction, co-authored by zoologist Mark Carwardine. In one of the chapters he and Mark visited Garamba National Park in the Democratic Republic of Congo, home to the last surviving northern white rhinos. It was when Douglas gave a talk at the Royal Geographical Society about his attempts to catch sight of one of these elusive rhinos by standing on top of a termite mound that Dave Stirling, founding director of SRI, first approached him and asked him to become a patron.  Douglas went on to accompany Dave and the rest of the SRI team on their inaugural Rhino Climb Kili expedition; a now yearly event that involves scaling Mount Kilimanjaro -  the highest point on the African continent - with one member of the team dressed as a rhino at all times. Douglas took turns to wear the costume along with everybody else, and his enthusiasm for the project helped to motivate SRI to raise £100,000 to go towards community projects in the areas surrounding Kilimanjaro.

Michael Werikhe

Michael Werikhe, fondly known to many as "The Rhino Man," was raised in Mombasa on Kenya's Indian Ocean coast. A lifelong protector of animals, Werikhe walked thousands of miles across several continents on his "Rhino Walks" to educate people around the world about the plight of the rhinoceros.

Campaigns

"Save the Rhinos", the EAZA Rhino Campaign 2005/6

Background

Supported by Save the Rhino International (SRI), EAZA has two major objectives; firstly to raise international awareness of the threats rhino face and to promote protection of these endangered animals and, secondly, to raise money which will directly support 13 selected rhino conservation projects in the wild in Asia and Africa. Some 125 million people visit zoos and aquariums in Europe annually.

Results

"Save the Rhinos" ended with an official closing session at the EAZA Annual Conference on 4 October 2006. A preliminary fundraising result of €515,842.81 was announced there, well exceeding the original target of €350,000. The final result was €660,000. In addition to the 13 EAZA-selected projects, Save the Rhino was able to make grants to several other projects and field programmes. Some of the beneficiaries have received continuous support ever since.

The success of former EAZA Conservation Campaigns have led to an increase in interest of NGOs and zoos outside Europe to support, contribute to, or participate in them. North American zoos, for example, have joined EAZA in the Save the Rhinos Campaign.

Rhino Legends campaign 2015

In May 2015 Save the Rhino launched the Rhino Legends campaign, in collaboration with Altrincham-based organisation Dial2Donate. The two organisations combined thoughts and skills to develop a concept based upon the 20th birthday celebrations of the charity – thus, 'Rhino Legends' was born. The campaign not only recognises the achievements and goals of the charity, it also upholds the plight of the creatures themselves.

Rhino Legends is a year-long campaign which will see Dial2Donate contribute weekly to its development through relevant social media, web content and email advertising. From creating content to proofreading established material, Dial2Donate will continue to support Save the Rhino for the foreseeable future.

References

External links 

Animal charities based in the United Kingdom